Thiolu
İşkodra, Böğürtlen
Rusçuk
Hizber, Hayreddin, Aziziye, Seyyar, Sofya, Islahat, Niş, Şehbaz-i Bahri, Vidin
Tutrakan
Şevket Nüma
Silistre
Semendire, Feth-ül Islam, Arkadi, Akka, Kılıç Ali's list includes fleet organisations of the Ottoman Navy during the Russo-Ottoman War of 1877–1878.

Dispositions in 1877 
In 1877, the naval ships of the Ottoman Navy were disposed as follows:

Mediterranean Fleet
1st Fleet (Volos)
Mahmûdiye, Asar-i Şevket, Bursa, Resmo
2nd Fleet (Crete)
Azîziye, Mukaddeme-i Hayır, Iclaliye, Libnan, Muzaffer, Edirne
3rd Fleet (Preveza)
Orhâniye, Muîn-i Zafer, Asar-i Tevfik, Sinop

Bosporus Fleet
Mesudiye, Osmaniye, Feth-i Bülend, Sürur, İzzeddin, Kandiye, Talia, Istanbul

Constantinople
Avnillah, Necm-i Şevket, Selimiye, Hüdâvendigâr

Guard vessels
Fethiye (Büyükdere), Şadiye (Golden Horn), Mansûre (Smyrna)

Under repair at Tersâne-i Âmire
Tahir-i Bahri, Peyk-i Şevket, Kosova, Peyk-i Zafer, Ertuğrul, Hizber, Kandiye, Akadiye, Eser-i Nusret, İsmail, İskenderiye

Fleet organisation in March 1877 
In March 1877, the Ottoman Navy was structured as follows:

Black Sea Fleet (Ferik Bozcaadalı Hasan Hüsnü Pasha)
Black Sea Ironclad Squadron (Liva Mustafa Pasha)
Âsâr-ı Tevfik, Orhaniye, Âsâr-ı Şevket, Necm-i Şevket, Iclâliye, Feth-i Bülend, Muin-i Zafer, Avnillah
Black Sea Wooden Hulled Squadron (Liva Ahmed Pasha)
Hüdavendigâr, Sinop, Muzaffer, Izmir, Edirne, Asır, Ismail, 

Mediterranean Fleet (Ferik Giritli Hüseyin Pasha)
Mediterranean Ironclad Squadron (Milalay Faik Bey)
Mesudiye, Aziziye, Osmaniye, Mahmudiye, Mukaddeme-i Hayır
Mediterranean Wooden Hulled Squadron (Liva Hasan Pasha)
Selimiye, Mansure, Utarit, Eser-i Cedîd, Sehir, Fevaid, Talia

Bosporus Squadron
Fethiye, Izzeddin, Kandiye, Hanya, Medar-i Zafer, Âsâr-ı Nusret

Danube Squadron (Ferik Mehmet Arif Pasha)
Lütf-ü Celîl, Hıfz-ür Rahman, Hizber, Seyfi, Semendire, Feth-ül Islam, Böğürtlen, İşkodra, Podgoriçe, Akka, Varna, Şevket Nüma, Sultaniye, Mürvet-i Nusret, Mesir-i Bahri, Feyz-i Bahri, Serafeddin, Medar-i Tevfik, Kayseriye, Batum, Selânik, Mersin, Lütfiye, Pursut, Canik, Kılıç Ali

Ottoman Danube Steamship Company (İdare-i Nehriye)
Hüseyin, Nüzhet, Arkadi, Islahat, Rusçuk, Aziziye, Seyyar, Lom, Vidin, Niş, Ziştovi, Sofya, Seyyar

Danube Squadron 
In 1877, Danube Squadron of the Ottoman Navy was disposed as follows:

April 27, 1877
Vidin
Varna, Ziştovi
Lom
Rusçuk
Rahova (present day: Oryahovo)
Podgoriçe
Niğbolu (present day: Nikopol)
İşkodra, Böğürtlen
Rusçuk (present day: Ruse)
Aziziye, Seyyar, Sofya, Islahat, Lom, Vidin, Niş
Tutrakan
Hizber, Şevket Nüma, Semendire, Arkadi
Silistre (present day: Silistra)
Kılıç Ali, Akka, Nüzhetiye, Şehbaz-i Bahri

July 10, 1877
Vidin
Varna, Ziştovi
Rahova
Podgoriçe
Niğb'

Sources 

Ottoman Navy
Orders of battle
Russo-Turkish War (1877–1878)
Lists of ships of the Ottoman Empire